This is a list of Scottish national rugby union players, i.e. those who have played for the Scotland national rugby union team. The list only includes players who have played in a Test match.

Note that the "position" column lists the position at which the player made his Test debut, not necessarily the position for which he is best known. A position in parentheses indicates that the player debuted as a substitute.

Amateur Era. (1871–1996) Capped at District level:

Professional Era (from 1996) Capped at District level:

References

 

 
Scotland